Bernard Deletré is a French operatic bass-baritone .

Life 
After studying flute and singing in the North of France, followed by a first prize in singing at the Conservatoire de Paris, Deletré performed with the Groupe Vocal de France before embarking on a career as a soloist. He also performs contemporary music, with the Atelier Lyrique du Rhin or the Péniche Opéra.

He has sung Monteverdi, Purcell, Cesti, Cavalli, Lully, Charpentier, Rameau, Handel or Mozart, and also Verdi, Bellini, Massenet, Offenbach, Janáček. Deletré has performed in the United States and Canada (Glimmerglass Festival, Berkeley Festival, New York City Opera, Boston Early Music Festival, Opera Lafayette Washington DC, Florence Gould Hall of New-York, Festival de Musique ancienne de Montréal), and also collaborates with the Dutch national company Reisopera and the Grand Théâtre de Genève. Deletré worked extensively in the 1980s and 1990s with the ensemble of Baroque music Les Arts Florissants,  led by William Christie.

He has participated in more than forty radio and CD recordings for Erato, EMI France, Adda, Opus 111, Naxos, Harmonia Mundi labels ...

He sings in both in the field of Baroque music and in the traditional opera repertoire: Giorgio in Bellini's I puritani in Nantes,  Schlemil in Offenbach's The Tales of Hoffmann (Oeser version) in Geneva directed by Olivier Py, Dikoï in Janáček's Káťa Kabanová in Geneva, Bartolo in Mozart's The Marriage of Figaro in Tourcoing and Orléans, the priest in Janáček's The Cunning Little Vixen in Geneva, Arkel in Pelléas and Mélisande on tour in the Netherlands. In 2005, he wrote, directed, conducted and performed the show La Fontaine Incognito to music by Isabelle Aboulker for the Grand Théâtre de Limoges.
 
He was heard in Massenet's Hérodiade (Phanuel) and  Bizet's Les pêcheurs de perles (Nourabad) at the Dorset Opera Festival, Massenet's Manon (comte des Grieux) on tour in the Netherlands, Cherubini's Médée (Creon) on tour in the Netherlands, Massenet's Don Quichotte (title role) and Gounod's Roméo et Juliette (Frère Laurent) in Limoges, Stravinsky's Pulcinella with the Orchestre national de Lille, a revival of The Tales of Hoffmann in Geneva, La Veuve et le Grillon, a work by Daniel Soulier, The Love for Three Oranges in Dijon and Limoges, Mozart's The Marriage of Figaro in Tourcoing and the Théâtre des Champs-Elysées, Busoni's Turandot Dijon, revival of Lully's Atys in Paris, Caen, Bordeaux, Versailles and New-York, Janáček's Jenůfa in Rennes and Limoges.

Among other projects, Deletré continues his collaboration with the American company Opera Lafayette: in the staging (and interpretation of the character of Baskir) for Félicien David's opera Lalla-Roukh in Washington and New York in January 2013, in the role of Don Alfonso in Cosi fan Tutte in October 2013 (reprise at the Château de Versailles on 30 January, 2 and 3 February 2014).

 Selected discography 
 Operas 
 2013: Lalla Roukh by Félicien David (Baskir)- Dir. Ryan Brown – Naxos
 2007: Ulysse by Jean-Féry Rebel (Urilas) - Dir. Reyne - AC Production
 2005: Isis by Lully (Jupiter) - Dir. Reyne -  AC Production
 2004: Orfeo by Monteverdi  (Plutone) - Dir. Malgoire - Dynamic
 2003: Agrippina by Haendel (Pallante) - Dir. Malgoire - Dynamic
 1997: La Dame blanche by Boëldieu (Mac Irton) - Dir. Minkowski - EMI
 1996: Calisto by Cavalli (Giove) - Dir. J.Glover - (live) BBC World
 1995: Médée by Marc-Antoine Charpentier (Créon) - Dir. Christie - Erato
 1993: Armide by Lully (Hidraot, Ubalde) - Dir. Herreweghe - Harm.M.
 1992: Idoménée by André Campra (title role) Dir. Christie - Har.M.
 1992: Le Baigneur by Denis Levaillant (title role) - Thésis
 1991: Les Indes galantes by Rameau (Huascar, Alvar) - Dir. Christie Har.M.
 1991: Orfeo by Rossi (Augure, Pluton) - Dir. Christie - Har.M
 1990: Alcyone by Marin Marais (solos divers) - Dir. Minkowski - Erato
 1990: Iphigénie en Aulide by Glück (Patrocle) - Dir. Gardiner - Erato
 1989: Le Malade imaginaire Molière/Charpentier - Dir. Minkowski - Erato
 1989: Platée by Jean-Philippe Rameau (Momus, Cithéron) - Dir. Minkowski - Erato
 1989: The Fairy-Queen by Henry Purcell (Drunken poet, Corydon, Hymen) - Dir. Christie  Har.M.
 1988: David et Jonathas by Marc-Antoine Charpentier (Vx de Samuel, Achis) - Dir. Christie -  Har.M.
 1988: Giasone  by Cavalli (Oreste) - Dir. R. Jacobs - Har.M.
 1987: Comédie-ballets by Lully (various) Minkowski - Erato
 1987: Atys by Jean-Baptiste Lully (Le Temps, Phobétor, Sangar) - Dir. Christie - Harmonia Mundi

 Oratorios - various 

 1990 :
 2005: L'Homme et son désir by Darius Milhaud - Orch. Nal de Lille - Dir. Jean-Claude Casadesus - Naxos 
 1996: La Fontaine-un portrait musical  - Dir. Hugo Reyne - EMI 
 1996: Motets by Jean-Baptiste Lully (solo bass) - Dir. Niquet 
 1995: Messe du couronnement by Wolfgang Amadeus Mozart (solo bass) - Dir. Patrick Marco - Verany 
 1995: Thétis secular cantata by Jean-Philippe Rameau (solo bass) - Dir. Coin 
 1995: Motets by Pierre Robert (solo bass) - Dir. Schneebeli 
 1993: Salve Regina by Haydn (solo bass) - Dir. Gester - Opus 111  
 1992: Motets by Sébastien de Brossard (solo bass) - Dir. Gester - Opus 111 
 1991: Motets by Michel-Richard de Lalande (solo bass) - Dir. Colléaux - Erato 
 1990: Marc-Antoine Charpentier, Les Quatre Saisons H.335 - 338, Psaumes de David H.174, H.231, H.179, Le Parlement de Musique, clavecin, orgue et direction Martin Gester. CD Opus 111. 
 1990: "Motets"  de Marc-Antoine Charpentier (solo bass) - Dir. Olivier Schneebeli - Adda 
 1989: Messe by de la Rue (ens.Cl.Janequin) - Har.M. 
 1989: Te Deum H.146 by Marc-Antoine Charpentier (solo bass) - Dir. Christie - Har.M.
 1989 : Psaumes by Camille Saint-Saëns (solo bass) - Dir. Mercier - Adda 
 1983 : Antifonia by  Scelsi (Groupe Vocal de France) - Dir. Tranchant

 Videos, radio and television 
 DVDs:  
 Agrippine by Haendel - Dir. Malgoire - 2004
 Orfeo by Monteverdi - Dir Malgoire – 2006
 Turandot by Busoni – Dir Kawka – 2011
 Atys by Lully – Dir. Christie - 2011
 Radio :
 L'homme qui avait... by Edith Lejet (Radio France)
 Scherzo by Bruno Gillet (Radio France)
 Barca di Venetia by Banchieri (Radio France/Péniche-opéra)
 O comme eau by Claude Prey (Radio France/Péniche-opéra)
 L'Arrache-Cœur by Elisabeth Sikora (Radio France)
 Les Chambres de Cristal by Reibel (Radio France/Péniche-
 Television:
 Le Malade Imaginaire Molière/Charpentier - La sept -
 Fairy Queen by Purcell - La Sept -
 Giasone by Cavalli - Télévision autrichienne -
 Atys de Lully - La Sept -

 Stagings 
 1986 – Le Cirque volant by Jean Absil - Région Nord/Pas-de-Calais
 1997 - Le joueur de flûte by  - translation of the booklet, adaptation, staging - Région Nord/Pas-de-Calais
 1998 - Le Paradis des chats by Vladimir Kojoukharov - adaptation, staging - Région Nord/Pas-de-Calais
 2002 - La Querelle des muses by Alexandros Markeas - Script, libretto, staging - Région Nord/Pas-de-Calais
 2005 - Atchafalaya by Isabelle Aboulker - staging - Région Nord/Pas-de-Calais, Montréal (Canada)
 2005 - La Fontaine et le Corbeau by Isabelle Aboulker - Adaptation, staging - Région Nord/Pas-de-Calais, Dijon
 2005 - La Fontaine incognito to a music by Isabelle Aboulker - Script, libretto, staging – Opéra-Théâtre de Limoges
 2007 - Les enfants du Levant by Isabelle Aboulker - Adaptation, staging - Région Nord/Pas-de-Calais
 2011 – Appointed director of the Atelier lyrique du conservatoire d'Hellemmes-Lille
 2012 - Autour de Beaumarchais to musics by Mozart and Rossini and texts by Beaumarchais - script, staging – Atelier lyrique d'Hellemmes
 2013 - Lalla-Roukh by Félicien David - Adaptation, staging - With the American company "Opera Lafayette" - Washington, New-York
 2013 - Lalla-Roukh by Félicien David - Adaptation, staging - Atelier lyrique d'Hellemmes
 2014 - Le Médecin malgré lui by Molière/Gounod - Adaptation, staging - Atelier lyrique d'Hellemmes
 2015 - L'Etoile by Emmanuel Chabrier - Adaptation, staging - Atelier lyrique d'Hellemmes
 2016 - La Fille de Madame Angot by Charles Lecocq - Adaptation, staging - Atelier lyrique d'Hellemmes
 2016 - Une éducation manquée by Emmanuel Chabrier - Adaptation, staging -  With the American company "Opera Lafayette" - Washington, New-York
 2017 - La Flûte enchantée by Mozart - Adaptation, staging - Atelier lyrique d'Hellemmes.
 2018 (project) - Véronique'' by André Messager - Adaptation, staging - Atelier lyrique d'Hellemmes.

References

External links 
  Biography on Bach Cantatas Website
 Bernard Deletré on Opéra national de Bordeaux
 Discography on Discogs
 Bernard Deletré on BnF
 Handel - Agrippina 'Col raggio placido', Deletré (YouTube)

Year of birth missing (living people)
Living people
Conservatoire de Paris alumni
Operatic basses
French basses
20th-century French male opera singers
21st-century French male opera singers